Central Theatre is a 2014 Malayalam suspense thriller film written and directed by Kiran Narayanan. The film stars Hemanth Menon, Sidhartha Siva, and Arun A Kumar as the protagonist.

Cast

Hemanth Menon as Sidharth Vijay
Arun A Kumar as Vinay
Sidhartha Siva as Aldrin Peter
Fayis Salman as Nadeer
Kozhikode Narayanan Nair as Vinay's grand father
Majeed as Vinay's Father
Anjali Aneesh Upasana aka Anjali Nair as Mariya John
Ambika Mohan as Sidharth Vijay's mother
Rosylynn as Vinay's mother
Kaladi Omana as Vinay's grand mother
Master Chethanlal as Amruth
Master Abhinav as Sreekuttan
Baby Prathyusha as Shruthi
Baby Arunima as Diya
Master Arun as Young Aldrin Peter

Plot
The story revolves around a kidnaps a kid by a pedophile, subsequent investigation, and the simmering tension. The entire story happens in a span of six hours and is told in three different perspectives, in four different chapters.

References

2014 films
2010s Malayalam-language films
Indian thriller films